Trouble: The Jamie Saft Trio Plays Bob Dylan is an album by Jamie Saft which was released on the Tzadik label in 2006.

Reception

In his review for Allmusic, Thom Jurek notes that "Saft feels no need to really improvise on the material, given its own merits, and comes up with a compelling, mysterious recording that brings folk music, jazz, blues, and other subtleties inherent in the work out".

Track listing
All compositions by Bob Dylan
 "What Was It You Wanted" – 7:46   
 "Ballad of a Thin Man" – 8:02   
 "Dignity" – 5:34   
 "God Knows" – 6:15   
 "Trouble" – 6:33   
 "Dirge" – 6:24   
 "Living the Blues" – 5:15   
 "Disease of Conceit" – 5:30

Personnel
Jamie Saft – piano, Hammond organ
Greg Cohen – bass
Ben Perowsky – drums
Mike Patton (track 2), Antony (track 7) – vocals

See also
List of songs written by Bob Dylan
List of artists who have covered Bob Dylan songs

References

Tzadik Records albums
Jamie Saft albums
2006 albums
Bob Dylan tribute albums